Autruy-sur-Juine (literally Autruy on Juine) is a commune in the Loiret department in north-central France.

Geography
The commune is traversed by the river Juine.

Population

See also
Communes of the Loiret department

References

External links

Official site
English translation

Communes of Loiret